Yuri's Day is a 2008 Russian drama film directed by Kirill Serebrennikov. The film won the Grand Prix at the Warsaw International Film Festival.

Plot
Before leaving for a permanent residence in Germany, famous opera singer Lyuba (Kseniya Rappoport) brings her son Andryusha (Roman Shmakov) to the Russian hinterland to say goodbye to her native home. For her these places represent beautiful romanticism of Russian poetry. The son goes to see an exposition of the local kremlin and disappears. Lyuba first looks for her son, and then remains in the town and waits for her son to return. Gradually she becomes a different person. Opera singer Lyubov loses her son, voice, destiny and transforms into a coarse cleaner Lucy. And in this new person additional qualities appear.

Cast
Kseniya Rappoport – Lyubov Pavlovna
Evgenia Kuznetsova – Tatiana
Sergey Sosnovsky – Sergeev
Sergey Medvedev – Andrei-monk
Igor Khripunov – Andrei-"Petty"
Vladislav Abashin – manager
Juris Lauciņš – prisoner
Ulyana Lukina – young
Olga Onischenko – lame woman
Natalia Batrak – saleswoman
Roman Shmakov – Andrei Dmitrievich Vasilyev, son of Lyubov Pavlovna
Dmitry Podnozov – policeman
Ekaterina Durova – nurse of Dunya
Valery Petrov – chief doctor of the hospital

Awards
Grand Prix – Warsaw International Film Festival
FICC/IFFS Prize; Special Mention, Oecumenical Jury; First Prize, Youth Jury – Locarno Festival
Golden Eagle Awards – Best Actress (Kseniya Rappoport)
Kinotavr – Best Actress (Kseniya Rappoport)
Russian Guild of Film Critics Awards – Best Actress (Kseniya Rappoport)

References

External links
 

2008 drama films
2008 films
Films directed by Kirill Serebrennikov
2000s Russian-language films
Russian drama films
Russian mystery films
Films about Orthodoxy